Francis Drake (c. 1580-1634), of Esher Place and Walton-on-Thames, Surrey, was an English Member of Parliament.

He was a Member (MP) of the Parliament of England for Amersham in 1625 and 1626. He was MP for Sandwich  in 1624 and Bridport in 1628.

References

1580 births
1634 deaths
17th-century English people
People of the Stuart period
People from Surrey
Members of the Parliament of England (pre-1707)

Year of birth uncertain